Pervaiz Kaleem is a Pakistani film screenwriter and a  director, based in Lahore.

Career
In 1987, Pervaiz started a movie as a film director and a writer named Jazbaat, but could not complete it due to production problems with this film. In 1988, Pervaiz signed a movie Bazar-e-Husn as a writer and he became known  in the Pakistani film industry. In 1993, Pervaiz and his brother Hamid Ali started a production named Ali Arts Productions. Their first movie under this banner was Gunnah (Sin) which came out in 1993. Their second production was Jaltay Badan (1994). In this film Pervaiz introduced his brother Safeer Ali also known as Aqeel. In 1994, Pervaiz made But Shikken. He feels a film screenwriter should explore subjects with a broad base when writing scripts and the film viewers should interpret these stories with an open mind.
 
Pervaiz Kaleem is the father of the editor and director Adeel pk, the father and son duo have recently worked together to write scripts in movies such as Mujhe Chand Chahiye (2000), Moosa Khan (2001), Pehla Sajda, Shiddat, Zill-e-Shah (2008) and Bhai Log (2011).

Awards and recognition
Nigar Award for Best Screenwriter in 1999 for film Jannat Ki Talash.

References

External links
Filmography of Pervaiz Kaleem on IMDb website 

1949 births
Living people
Film directors from Lahore
Pakistani screenwriters
Muhajir people
People from Saharanpur
Nigar Award winners